Arthur Taylor House in Paris, Idaho was built in 1890.  It was listed on the National Register of Historic Places in 1982.

References

Houses on the National Register of Historic Places in Idaho
1890s architecture in the United States
Houses in Bear Lake County, Idaho
National Register of Historic Places in Bear Lake County, Idaho